Exposed (originally titled Daughter of God) is a 2016 American thriller film, written and directed by Gee Malik Linton (credited as Declan Dale), in his directorial debut. The film stars Ana de Armas, Keanu Reeves, Christopher McDonald, Big Daddy Kane, and Mira Sorvino. The film was released in a limited release and through video on demand on January 22, 2016, by Lionsgate Home Entertainment.

Plot
A police officer, Detective Galban, investigates the circumstances behind the death of his partner, Detective Joey Cullen. The mysterious case leads to an attempted police cover-up and a dangerous secret involving an unlikely young woman. The two parallel story lines initially appear to have little in common, but as events gradually unfold in the two separate urban worlds, the young woman, Isabel De La Cruz, appears to somehow be involved in the detective's demise.

Detective Cullen was depraved and corrupted. His colleagues fear that the investigation into his death will bring these facts to light. The results would include bad press for the police department and the loss of his pension for his family. The fear is based on the fact that one of the prime suspects in the case is a young ex-convict who had allegedly been sexual assaulted with a broomstick wielded by Detective Cullen. Supervisors within the precinct would rather let the murderer go free than to open up a Pandora's Box of troubles for everyone concerned.

Meanwhile, in Isabel's private world, Isabel befriends a young girl named Elisa.  Isabel suspects that Elisa is being abused at home by her father.  She also believes that the strange beings she has begun seeing on the streets are angels.  Accordingly, she thinks that her mysterious "impossible" pregnancy is a gift from God, which no one else is willing to believe.  Isabel returns to her parents’ home to live.  When Elisa says that Isabel's father has hurt her, it triggers a sudden recollection in Isabel's mind of molestation by her father many years ago.  All of Isabel's buried memories are suddenly released in an avalanche of images.  In truth, it turns out that Isabel's "angels" are a fabrication of her own mind. She created them to accompany a fictional narrative that would replace the unbearably traumatic memories of being raped by Detective Cullen on the subway platform the night that her "visions" began. She further suppressed the memory of catching him off guard afterwards and killing him in a fit of righteous rage.

In response to the memories and to Elisa's crying, Isabel kills her father in order to protect Elisa.  Detective Galban is then sent to the scene of the murder.  When Galban looks at an old photograph of Isabel's family it is revealed that Elisa is also a fabrication of Isabel's mind.  The imaginary girl is actually Isabel as a child.  In the end Elisa disappears as Isabel is in church praying for the strength to accept everything that has happened.

Cast

 Ana de Armas as Isabel de La Cruz
 Keanu Reeves as Detective Scott Galban
 Christopher McDonald as Lt. Galway 
 Big Daddy Kane as Black
 Mira Sorvino as Janine Cullen
 Venus Ariel as Elisa
 Ariel Pacheco as Naldo 
 Laura Gómez as Eva 
 Melissa Linton as Detective Sarah Ramirez
 Michael Rispoli as Detective Dibronski
 Danny Hoch as Detective Joey Cullen 
 Ismael Cruz Córdova as Jose de La Cruz
 Monte Greene as Anthony Galban (VO)
 Jeanette Dilone as Marisol de La Cruz

Production

Development
On September 6, 2014, it was announced that Keanu Reeves and Ana de Armas would star together in the movie Daughter of God, after the identical news of April 4 for Eli Roth's Knock Knock, and that Reeves and Robin Gurland would be producers of the film. On November 7, Remark Films boarded on its first project to co-finance the film. On November 8, Mira Sorvino joined the film. The other cast include Christopher McDonald, Big Daddy Kane, Michael Rispoli, Laura Gómez. In December 2014, Carlos José Alvarez was set to score the film.

Filming
Principal photography began in early November 2014 in New York City. On November 26, filming was taking place in Brooklyn.

Controversy
The original story was a surreal bi-lingual drama, reminiscent of Pan's Labyrinth and Irreversible, that focused on child sexual abuse, violence against women, mass incarceration, and police violence committed under the pretense of the state's authority. However, the executives at Lionsgate Premiere thought they had been sold a Keanu Reeves cop-thriller. To increase the film's potential box office, during the editing process Lionsgate changed the story's focus to center on Reeves' character, and changed the film into a crime thriller. Gee Malik Linton is the director of the film, but is listed under the pseudonym of Declan Dale.

Reception

Box office
Although the film has earned only $269,915 in worldwide theatrical box office, sales of its DVD/Blu-ray releases have earned $1.6 million.

Critical response
The film holds an approval rating of 8% on review aggregator Rotten Tomatoes, based on 25 reviews, with an average rating of 2.9/10. The website's critical consensus reads, "Exposed lays its flaws fittingly bare for all but the least discerning viewers to see, starting with a dull yet convoluted plot that utterly overpowers the efforts of an intriguing cast." On Metacritic, the film holds a score of 23 out of 100, based on 5 critics, indicating "generally unfavorable reviews".

Frank Scheck of The Hollywood Reporter gave the film a mixed review writing: "There are glimpses here and there of the film Exposed might have been, especially through the well-photographed upper Manhattan locations that provide a memorably gritty atmosphere. But anyone looking for a good Reeves thriller would be well advised to wait until John Wick 2."

Mark Kermode, from The Guardian, compared the studio release with Daughter of God, the director's cut, on his YouTube show.

Indie film critic, Saint Pauly, wrote a comparison of both versions of the movie.

See also
 Dissociative disorder
 Fugue state
 Sexual abuse incest in film
 Self-deception

References

External links
 
  (rating 1/5)

2016 films
2010s Spanish-language films
2016 directorial debut films
2016 thriller films
American nonlinear narrative films
American thriller films
MoviePass Films films
Films about amnesia
Films about domestic violence
Films about rape
Films about sexual abuse
Films shot in New York City
Incest in film
American pregnancy films
2010s English-language films
2010s American films